"Don't Leave" is a song by British duo Snakehips and Danish singer MØ. It was released on 6 January 2017 through Sony Music. The song was co-written by Joe Janiak, Negin Djafari, Rachel Keen (better known by her stage name Raye), and co-produced by Snakehips, Joe Janiak, and Cass Lowe, who also co-wrote AlunaGeorge's 2016 song "I Remember".

Promotion
"Don't Leave" was accompanied by a lyric video upon its release.

Music video
The official music video for the song was released through Snakehips YouTube account on 19 January 2017, and it was directed by Malia James. The music video features sequences of MØ alongside Italian model Francesco Cuizza.

Charts

Weekly charts

Year-end charts

Certifications

References

2017 singles
2017 songs
Snakehips (duo) songs
MØ songs
Songs written by Raye (singer)
Songs written by MØ
Songs written by Cass Lowe
Songs written by Joe Janiak
Sony Music UK singles
Songs written by Negin Djafari